Aurelio Sabattani JUD (18 October 1912 – 19 April 2003) was an Italian cardinal of the Roman Catholic Church. He served as Prefect of the Apostolic Signatura from 1967 until his death and was elevated to the rank of cardinal in 1983.

Education
He was educated at the Seminary of Imola, from 1922 until 1925 as well as the Regional Seminary Benedetto XV in Bologna from 1927 until 1934 where he earned a master's degree in dogmatic theology. He continued his studies at the Pontifical Institute "S. Apollinare" in Rome where he earned a doctorate utroque iuris (in both canon and civil law), with his thesis on De vita et operibus Alexandri Tartagni de Imola, 1939.

Priesthood 
He was ordained on 26 July 1935 at the episcopal chapel in Faenza, by Antonio Scarante, Bishop of Faenza. After a brief service in the Vatican Secretariat of State (1939–1940) he had to return to his diocese because of family affairs. He was from 1940 until 1955 successively in Imola, diocesan chancellor; faculty member of its seminary; diocesan counselor of Christian Teachers; cathedral canon; in Bologna, judge and official of the regional ecclesiastical tribunal; while during the summer months of 1942 until 1947 he worked at the Vatican Secretariat of State. He was created Privy chamberlain supra numerum on 30 September 1943. He was named auditor of the Roman Rota on 31 January 1955. The cardinal vicar of Rome named him spiritual counselor of the Catholic Physicians Association of Rome in 1955 holding that post until 1965.

Episcopate
Pope Paul VI appointed him titular archbishop of Justiniana Prima and appointed him Prelate of Loreto and pontifical delegate of its shrine on 24 June 1965. He was consecrated on 25 July of that year by Amleto Giovanni Cicognani, Cardinal Secretary of State. He was appointed as Secretary of the Supreme Tribunal of the Apostolic Signatura on 13 July 1971. He resigned the pastoral government of the prelature on 30 September 1971. He was appointed as Pro-Prefect of the Supreme Tribunal of the Apostolic Signatura and Pro-president of the Vatican Court of Appeal on 17 May 1982.

Cardinalate 
He was made Cardinal-Deacon of Sant'Apollinare alle Terme Neroniane-Alessandrine by Pope John Paul II in the consistory of 2 February 1983. He was appointed Prefect the next day. Pope John Paul named him Archpriest of St. Peter's Basilica and President of the Fabric of St. Peter on 8 February of that year. He resigned the prefecture of the Signatura on 1 July 1988. He was the protodeacon of the College of Cardinals from 26 November 1990 until he became a cardinal-priest on 5 April 1993. He resigned the post of archpriest in 1991. He opted for the order of cardinal priests and his deaconry was elevated pro hac vice to title in April 1993. He died in 2003 in Piazza Santa Marta in Vatican City and is buried in his family's tomb in Riolo Terme.

References

1912 births
2003 deaths
Protodeacons
20th-century Italian cardinals
20th-century Italian Roman Catholic titular archbishops
Cardinal Vicars
Participants in the Second Vatican Council
Prefects of the Apostolic Signatura
Cardinals created by Pope John Paul II
People from the Province of Bologna